Urbana is an unincorporated community in Paw Paw Township, Wabash County, in the U.S. state of Indiana.

History

The Urbana post office has been in operation since 1858.

Geography

References

Unincorporated communities in Wabash County, Indiana
Unincorporated communities in Indiana